John Miller (1870 in Dumbarton – 1933 in Glasgow) was a Scottish footballer who played in the Football League for Bolton Wanderers, Derby County and The Wednesday.

Career
Miller began his career with his local club Union Dumbarton, before being signed by Dumbarton in 1891. He made his debut and scored on 2 May 1891 against St Mirren, which was the final league game of the season. He then played two weeks later and scored in the League Play-Off against Rangers. In the 1891–92 season, Miller made 20 league appearances and scored 15 goals as the Sons won the title outright, having shared the championship the previous year. At its end, he played for the Scottish League XI against the rival Scottish Football Alliance, scoring twice.

In June 1892, Miller joined Liverpool in their first season. He made his debut and scored the sixth goal in Liverpool's first ever match, which was a 7–1 win friendly against Rotherham Town on 1 September. Miller was his league debut on 24 September against Bury, in which he also scored. He went on to make a further 20 league appearances and score a further 21 goals, including 5 against Fleetwood Rangers on 3 December, helping Liverpool to win the Lancashire League. He also made 3 appearances in the FA Cup in which he scored a hat-trick against Nantwich on 15 October. Miller played all of Liverpool's matches in the Lancashire Senior Cup and Liverpool Senior Cup (4 and 3 appearances, respectively) and scored a total of 3 goals.

At the end of the season, Miller was a pay rise of "£100 down and £3 per week" which was rejected by Liverpool, so after his contract expired in June 1893, he signed for The Wednesday, playing in the First Division. He played in the first match of the season, but was injured and on 8 December, he was granted a leave of absence to his home in Dumbarton due "ill-health and the injury". He returned a month later and in the season he made a total of 13 appearances, scoring 7 goals.

He returned to Scotland to join Airdrieonians, before joining Clyde on 28 June 1894, playing in Scottish Division One. He made 17 appearances and scored 12 times that season, finishing as the league's top goalscorer. On 13 June 1895, Miller joined Derby County. Over his 2 seasons at the club, he made 62 league appearances, scoring 20 goals. He also made 9 appearances in the FA Cup and scored 5 goals. In October 1897, Miller transferred to Bolton Wanderers for a fee of £100. He made 8 league appearances and 1 appearance in the FA Cup, but didn't score.

Honours
Dumbarton
 Scottish Football League: Champions 1890–91; 1891–92
 Dumbartonshire Cup: Winners 1891–92
 League Charity Cup: Winners 1890–91
Liverpool

 Lancashire League: Winners 1892–93
 Liverpool Senior Cup: Winners 1892–93

Career statistics

Notes

References

1870 births
1933 deaths
Dumbarton F.C. players
Liverpool F.C. players
Sheffield Wednesday F.C. players
Airdrieonians F.C. (1878) players
Clyde F.C. players
Scottish footballers
English Football League players
Association football forwards
Sportspeople from Dumbarton
Footballers from West Dunbartonshire
Scottish Football League players
Scottish Football League representative players
Derby County F.C. players
Bolton Wanderers F.C. players
Scottish league football top scorers